Path of Change (sometimes translated as Way to Change, in Czech: Cesta změny) was a small liberal party in the Czech Republic. The party was led by Jiří Lobkowicz. It has no members of parliament and no elected councillors in local government.

The party was a founding member of the European Democratic Party (EDP), which together with the European Liberal Democrat and Reform Party (ELDR) form the Alliance of Liberals and Democrats for Europe (ALDE). It had joined the ELDR before it joined the EDP.

On 3 May 2012 the party decided to dissolve.

See also
 Liberalism
 Contributions to liberal theory
 Liberalism worldwide
 List of liberal parties
 Liberal democracy
 Liberalism in the Czech lands

References

External links
 Path of Change international site (in English, at vjrott.com web)

Liberal parties in the Czech Republic
European Democratic Party
Defunct political parties in the Czech Republic
Centrist political parties in the Czech Republic
2012 disestablishments in the Czech Republic
2001 establishments in the Czech Republic
Political parties established in 2001
Political parties disestablished in 2012